General elections were held in the Faroe Islands on 8 November 1954. The Union Party emerged as the largest party in the Løgting, winning 7 of the 27 seats.

Results

References

Faroes
1954 in the Faroe Islands
Elections in the Faroe Islands
November 1954 events in Europe
Election and referendum articles with incomplete results